The 1929–30 Illinois Fighting Illini men's basketball team represented the University of Illinois.

Regular season
The 1929-30 season was head coach Craig Ruby's 8th at the University of Illinois.  Ruby had 3 returning lettermen from a team that had finished in a fifth place tie in the Big Ten the year before. The Fighting Illini showed no improvement in overall play, finishing with a record of 8 wins and 8 losses, though it improved to a conference record of 7 wins and 5 losses.  The starting lineup included captain and future Illini head coach Douglas R. Mills, George Fencl and Robert Kamp at guard, Elbridge May at center with Charles Harper and Elbert Kamp at the forward spots.

Roster

Source

Schedule

|-	
!colspan=12 style="background:#DF4E38; color:white;"| Non-Conference regular season
|- align="center" bgcolor=""

|-	
!colspan=9 style="background:#DF4E38; color:#FFFFFF;"|Big Ten regular season

Bold Italic connotes conference game
												
Source

Awards and honors

References

Illinois Fighting Illini
Illinois Fighting Illini men's basketball seasons
Fighting Illini
Fighting Illini